The facilities operated by the Connecticut Audubon Society include:

 Connecticut Audubon Society  Birdcraft Museum and Sanctuary
 Connecticut Audubon Society Center at Fairfield
 Connecticut Audubon Society Coastal Center at Milford Point

Connecticut Audubon